is a railway station in the city of Shirakawa, Fukushima Prefecture, Japan, operated by East Japan Railway Company (JR East).

Lines
Kutano Station is served by the Tōhoku Main Line, and is located 192.9 rail kilometers from the official starting point of the line at Tokyo Station.

Station layout
The station has one island platform connected to the station building by a footbridge. The station is unattended.

Platforms

History
Kutano Station opened on October 12, 1919. The station was absorbed into the JR East network upon the privatization of the Japanese National Railways (JNR) on April 1, 1987.

Surrounding area
Kutano Post Office
Takahashi River

See also
 List of Railway Stations in Japan

External links

  

Stations of East Japan Railway Company
Railway stations in Fukushima Prefecture
Tōhoku Main Line
Railway stations in Japan opened in 1919
Shirakawa, Fukushima